The Athens Olympic Tennis Centre Main Court, commonly known simply as, "The Main Court", is the main stadium of the Athens Olympic Tennis Centre, which is a group of 16 tennis courts, located at the Athens Olympic Sports Complex. The Main Court seats 8,600 people for tennis matches.

History

The Main Court was completed in February 2004, and officially opened on August 2, 2004. The Main Court hosted tennis events at the 2004 Athens Summer Olympics.

In 2017, the Greek Basket League club, AEK Athens, revealed their plans to acquire the facility, in order to transform it into their home indoor basketball hall, with a spectator capacity for basketball games, of 9,500-10,000 seats.

See also
 List of tennis stadiums by capacity

References

External links
2004 Summer Olympics official report. Volume 2. p. 409.
OAKA.com profile. 

Buildings and structures completed in 2004
Venues of the 2004 Summer Olympics
Olympic tennis venues
Tennis
Indoor arenas in Greece